Labbacallee wedge tomb is a large pre-historic burial monument, located  north-west of Fermoy and  south-east of Glanworth, County Cork, Ireland. It is the largest Irish wedge tomb and dates from roughly 2300 BC. The tomb is a National Monument in State Care no. 318. It was the first megalithic tomb in the country to be described by an antiquarian writer, in John Aubrey’s manuscript of 1693.

Features

Labbacallee is the largest wedge tomb in Ireland. The tomb has three massive capstones, with the largest weighing 10 tonnes, and three large buttress stones at the back. The burial area consists of a long chamber, divided by a large vertical slab into two areas of unequal length. The eastern or inner end, when covered by the capstone, formed a sealed and self contained burial unit. The main chamber area, to the west, with two large capstones, was also sealed by a large ‘entrance’ stone. Access to both chambers was only possible by the removal of the end capstone. The gallery measures about 7.75m long from inside the stone closing its western end to the inner face of the back stone of the Eastern chamber. The tomb appears to have been closed up and abandoned shortly after the burials were deposited in it. At a later period, the chamber was entered through the side wall, close to the entrance stone at the west end. A large corbel was displaced and side stones were moved to allow access. The main chamber was used as a shelter, resulting in the disturbance of the previous interments. The main evidence for this activity consists of animal bones, charcoal and sherds of cooking pot.

Excavations
Labbacalle Wedge Tomb was one of the first sites excavated under the new National Monuments Act (1930) by Harold Leask and Liam Price in 1934. The excavations revealed a number of burials, fragments of a late Stone Age decorated pot, and fragments of bone and stone. The west chamber contained parts of an adult male and a child, along with the skull believed to belong to the female skeleton in the east chamber and several sherds of a single late Stone Age decorated pot. According to the excavation report, at this time the smallest chamber was filled to the top with rubble, including earth, stones, ash and the bones of animals and humans. When these were cleared a skeleton of a woman was exposed, together with a bone pin which might have fastened a garment or shroud. The woman's skull was missing but later found upright in the large main chamber. One of the leg bones of the skeleton was deformed.

Folklore
The folklore behind the wedge tomb, as the translation "Hag's Bed" suggests, is that a hag lived at the site. She has been associated with the 'Cailleach', a hag goddess from Celtic tradition. 
 There are a number of different stories about the wedge tomb. In one version of the story, Mogh Ruith, the hag's husband, ‘had an eye’ for the hag's sister. In a fit of jealously the hag chased the druid towards the river. He had reached the water and started to cross it, but the hag threw an enormous boulder which struck the druid, toppling him and pinning him down under the water. It is not specified in the tale how the hag died but she is believed to be buried in the tomb which was once her dwelling. 
Some believe that she was killed by Mogh Ruith's spirit.

There is also a later tale of a supernatural encounter at Labbacallee. According to the tale, four local men went to the tomb in the middle of the night, with the aim of digging for the treasure that they had heard was buried there. As they started to dig, it is said that an enchanted cat appeared, fire bursting from its tail, terrifying the men, who were dazzled by the light emitting from it. Panicking, they ran screaming from the scene, and one of the men fell into the nearby river and drowned. The remaining men lived to tell the tale, and their experience stood as a stark warning to others that they should never, under any circumstances, disturb the resting place of the long dead at this most mysterious of megalithic sites.

References

Sources
 
 Noonan, Damien (2001). "Castles & Ancient Monuments of Ireland", Arum Press. 
 Weir, A (1980). Early Ireland. A Field Guide. Belfast: Blackstaff Press
 DeValera, Ruaidhrí; Ó Nualláin, Sean (1982). Survey of the Megalithic Tombs of Ireland. Volume IV. Counties Cork, Kerry, Limerick, Tipperary. Dublin: The Stationery Office
 Brindley, A. L.; Lanting, J. N.; Mook, W. G. (1987). "Radiocarbon Dates from Moneen and Labbacallee, County Cork". The Journal of Irish Archaeology. 4: 13–20. 
 Power, Denis (1989). "County Focus: Cork". Archaeology Ireland. 3 (2): 46–50

External links

 Megalithic Ireland – Photographs of Labbacallee wedge tomb
 Megalithomania – Site plan and photographs of Labbacallee Wedge Tomb
  Ancient Ireland – Photographs of Labbacallee – Leaba Callighe – Hag's Bed
 Roaringwater Journal – Labbacallee
 Voices from the Dawn – Labbacallee Wedge Tomb
 The Irish Place – The Mysterious Past of the Labbacallee Wedge Tomb

Megalithic monuments in Ireland
Archaeological sites in County Cork
Burial monuments and structures
National Monuments in County Cork
Tombs in the Republic of Ireland